

N

N